The Bishopric of Courland (Low German: Bisdom Curland) was the second smallest (4500 km2) ecclesiastical state in the Livonian Confederation founded in the aftermath of the Livonian Crusade. During the Livonian War in 1559 the bishopric became a possession of Denmark, and in 1585 sold by Denmark to Poland–Lithuania.

History 

In ancient times a Baltic tribe, the Curonians, inhabited Courland and had strong links with the maritime tribes in both sides of the Baltic sea.  In 1230, Lamekinas, Duke of West Courland, signed an agreement with the vice-legat Baldwin of Alna (Baudoin d’Aulne) of the Pope Gregory IX about the voluntary conversion of his people to Christianity and receiving the same rights as the inhabitants of Gotland.

In 1234 Dominican friar Engelbert was appointed to be the first bishop of Courland. In 1242 the area of Courland passed under the influence of the Teutonic Knights owing to the amalgamation of this order with that of the Brethren of the Sword in 1237.  In 1253 the territory of Courland was divided between the Bishopric of Courland and the Livonian branch of the Order of Teutonic Knights. After severe defeat of knights in the Battle of Durbe the Bishop  Heinrich von Lützelburg left Courland in 1263 and the new bishop Edmund of Werth returned in his bishopric only after suppression of Curonian and Semigallian insurgencies in 1290.

During the Livonian War (1558–1582), under the increasing pressure of the Tsardom of Russia, the Livonian Confederation dissolved. 
In 1559 the Bishop of Courland and Ösel-Wiek Johann V von Münchhausen sold his lands to King Frederick II of Denmark for 30,000 thalers. The Danish king gave the territory to his younger brother Duke Magnus of Holstein. Duke Magnus was crowned King of Livonia in 1570. In 1577, having lost Ivan's favor and receiving no support from his brother, Magnus called on the Livonian nobility to rally to him in a struggle against foreign occupation. He was attacked by Ivan's forces and taken prisoner. On his release, he renounced his royal title.

Magnus spent the last six years of his life at the castle of Pilten, where he died as a pensioner of the Polish crown. He promised to transfer it to the Duchy of Courland after his death, but this plan failed and only later Wilhelm Kettler did regain this district. After Magnus of Livonia died in 1583, Polish–Lithuanian Commonwealth invaded his territories in the Duchy of Courland and Frederick II of Denmark decided to sell his rights of inheritance.

Chronology 

September 1234: Bishopric of Courland (Bistum Kurland) established (formally declared on 11 February 1232), consisting of three separate enclaves after numerous distributions of the Curonian lands among the Bishops of Courland, and of Riga, and the Teutonic Order.
1290: The cathedral chapter is incorporated into the Teutonic Order lands, the bishopric is subjected to the Order.
1341: The bishops were also rulers of the island of Runö (now Ruhnu in SW-Estonia) from at least 1341.
1520: Made a sovereign principality (prince-bishopric) of the Holy Roman Empire (formally from January 1521), but style of prince not used.
20 May 1560: Sold to the King of Denmark, given as an appanage (Stift Kurland) to Magnus Herzog von Holstein, the brother of the king Frederick II of Denmark.
1578: Bishop Magnus accepts sovereignty of the Polish–Lithuanian Commonwealth (not ratified by the Sejm of Poland–Lithuania, nor recognized by Denmark).
20 April 1585: Sold by Denmark to Poland–Lithuania according to the Treaty of Kronborg.

Bishops of Courland

See also

Archbishopric of Riga
Bishopric of Dorpat
Bishopric of Ösel-Wiek
Bishopric of Reval
Courland
Couronian colonization
Couronian colonization of the Americas
Duchy of Courland and Semigallia
Kingdom of Livonia
Livonian Brothers of the Sword

References

External links 
Courland by Herman Rosenthal
Courland Geography and Natural History
Die Kurländische Ritterschaft
 Duchy of Courland, 1561-1795
Liepājas un Kurzemes bīskapa

1562 disestablishments
States and territories established in 1234
History of Courland
Former monarchies of Europe
Prince-bishoprics in Livonia
Historical regions in Latvia